The Käsivarsi Wilderness Area is the second-largest wilderness reserve in Finland. It was established in 1991 like all the other 11 wilderness areas in Lapland. It is the most popular wilderness area in Finland, by number of visitors. It is governed by Parks & Wildlife Finland (the Metsähallitus).

All Finnish fells of over 1,000 meters of height, except for nearby Saana, are situated in the Käsivarsi Wilderness Area. 

Finland's highest peak Halti, about 1324 masl, is located in northern part of area. Kilpisjärvi-Halti hiking route is 55km long. 800km long Nordkalottleden Trail also goes through the area. Also marked path goes up to Saana. Kilpisjärvi Visitor Centre provides information about the area and routes.

Käsivarsi, the Finnish word for arm, refers to the location of the area—in the raised arm of the Maiden of Finland.

It is adjacent to Reisa National Park in Norway.

References

External links
Official Website: Nationalparks.fi/kasivarsi
Official Website for Kilpisjarvi Visitor Centre

Enontekiö
Protected areas established in 1991
1991 establishments in Finland
Tourist attractions in Lapland (Finland)
Wilderness areas of Finland